Kenneth Borden Smith (born May 13, 1943) is a Canadian former professional hockey player who played 648 games in the Eastern Hockey League, with the Philadelphia Ramblers, Long Island Ducks and Clinton Comets. He also played in the American Hockey League with the Baltimore Clippers, Springfield Kings and Cleveland Barons. He was later a coach after his retirement from hockey. He was inducted into the Greater Utica Sports Hall of Fame in 2000.

References

External links
 

1943 births
Living people
Canadian ice hockey left wingers
Ice hockey people from Quebec
Sportspeople from Rouyn-Noranda